Living Media India Limited, d.b.a. India Today Group, is an Indian media conglomerate based in New Delhi, India. It has interests in magazines, newspapers, books, radio, television, printing and the Internet.

History 
India Today Group was founded in 1975 and its first publication was India Today which was a fortnightly news magazine. Aroon Purie is the current chairman and editor-in-chief and Dinesh Bhatia is the current CEO of India Today Group.

Business venture

Channels  
 India Today Television
 Aaj Tak
 Dilli Aaj Tak (2006–2020)

 TV Today Network

Publications
 India Today (magazine)
 Business Today (India)

Radio  
 Ishq 104.8 FM

Other business  
 Vasant Valley School
 Care Today

References

External links
 

.01
Mass media companies of India
Conglomerate companies of India
Book publishing companies of India
Magazine publishing companies of India
Mass media companies based in Delhi
Companies based in New Delhi
Indian companies established in 1975
Holding companies established in 1975
Mass media companies established in 1975
Publishing companies established in 1975
Companies listed on the National Stock Exchange of India
Companies listed on the Bombay Stock Exchange
Television broadcasting companies of India
Television networks in India
Broadcasting